Daegu Grand Park Station is a station of the Daegu Metro Line 2 in Yeonho-dong, Suseong District, Daegu, South Korea. Daegu Grand Park is not yet opened.

The station is located next to Daegu Samsung Lions Park and nearby Daegu Stadium.

See also 
 Daegu Grand Park
 Daegu Stadium
 Daegu Samsung Lions Park

External links 
  Cyber station information from Daegu Metropolitan Transit Corporation

Daegu Metro stations
Suseong District
Railway stations opened in 2005